Apalit Church is a Neo-Renaissance-style church located at Apalit, in the province of Pampanga, Philippines. The additional construction of the two towers beside the church served as reinforcements to improve the structural integrity of the church. Also, the church houses bells manufactured by the Sunicos.

History
In 1597, the Parish of Apalit was separated from the Parish of Calumpit. Fr. Pedro de Vergara was installed as the first curé of Apalit.

On June 28, 1844, the traditional fluvial procession called Libad honouring Saint Peter the Apostle was instituted by Capitán del Pueblo Don Pedro Armayan Espíritu.

On July 22, 2017, the holy relic of St. Peter was enthroned in the Parish. The holy relic is a fragment of the bones of the remains of St. Peter. This is the only church that has the relic of St. Peter other than St. Peter's Basilica in Rome.

Architectural history

Fr. Juan Cabello
 He began the construction of the church and convento from 1641 until 1645.

Fr. Simón de Alarcia
 From 1854 to 1860, he tried to build a three-nave church using stone and brick materials. However, records do not indicate if he was able to finish the church.
 1863: the church is destroyed in an earthquake that damaged buildings in Manila.

Fr. Antonio Redondo
 Following the initial plans of Don Ramón Hermosa, an assistant officer to the Minister of Public Works, he laid the foundations of the new church in January 1876.
 The construction of the church was completed in 1883. It was reconsecrated during the town fiesta of that year.

Fr. Toribio Fanjul
 The two belltowers were completed in 1896.

Msgr. Rústico C. Cuevas
 1989: Major renovations were conducted at the church.

Architectural features

Apalit Church measures 59 meters long and 14 meters wide. The facade resembles Neo-Renaissance Style with its plain, low segmental pediment and the symmetrical alignment of 2 flanking towers. The semi-circular main door with a circular window above is framed by receding semicircular arches in relief.

The ceiling art paintings, also known as trompe l'oeil were done by a native of Apalit (Marcilino "Siling" Serrano), under the supervision of Caesare Alberoni, an Italian free-lance painter. One notable ceiling art paintings was located in the cupola of the Apalit Church, giving a rendition of the Apocalypse.

There are 6 bells located at the Apalit Church, 5 of which came from Fundicion de Hilario Sunico Jaboneros.

Below were the list of the bells with corresponding inscriptions:

Present condition

Marker from the National Historical Commission of the Philippines

The marker of Church of Apalit was installed in 1939 at Apalit, Pampanga. It was installed by Philippines Historical Committee (now National Historical Commission of the Philippines).

Gallery

References

Roman Catholic churches in Pampanga
Augustinian churches in the Philippines
Churches in the Roman Catholic Archdiocese of San Fernando